The Northern League was the top-flight ice hockey league in Scotland and initially northern England, from 1966.  In 1982 it merged with the Inter-City League and the English League North to form the British Hockey League.

The League developed out of the far more limited Scottish League, established in 1962.  In 1963, The Wasps, based at Whitley Bay, joined and by 1966 a regular but limited schedule had been established.

In 1966, the better British teams, mostly in Scotland, agreed to form a league to provide matches throughout the season.  Initially of seven teams joined.  It proved a success, and in 1970 various English teams formed a Southern League, leaving the Northern League as an entirely Scottish competition.

Champions
1966–67 Paisley Mohawks
1967–68 Paisley Mohawks
1968–69 Paisley Mohawks
1969–70 Murrayfield Racers
1970–71 Murrayfield Racers
1971–72 Murrayfield Racers
1972–73 Dundee Rockets
1973–74 Whitley Bay Warriors
1974–75 Whitley Bay Warriors
1975–76 Murrayfield Racers
1976–77 Fife Flyers
1977–78 Fife Flyers
1978–79 Murrayfield Racers
1979–80 Murrayfield Racers
1980–81 Murrayfield Racers
1981–82 Dundee Rockets

References
Martin C. Harris, Homes of British Ice Hockey

 
Defunct ice hockey leagues in the United Kingdom
Ice hockey leagues in Scotland
Defunct sports leagues in Scotland
Sports leagues established in 1966
1966 establishments in the United Kingdom
1982 disestablishments in Scotland
Sports leagues disestablished in 1982